The Inspiration Rocks are a group of rock outcrops at the northern edge of the Cache Heights, in the Jones Mountains of Antarctica. They were mapped by the University of Minnesota Jones Mountains Party, 1960–61, and so named by the party because from these rocks almost the entire group of Jones Mountains come into view.

References

Rock formations of Ellsworth Land